Carver Dana Andrews (January 1, 1909 – December 17, 1992) was an American film actor who became a major star in what is now known as film noir. A leading man during the 1940s, he continued acting in less prestigious roles and character parts into the 1980s. He is best known for his portrayal of obsessed police detective Mark McPherson in the noir Laura (1944) and his critically acclaimed performance as World War II veteran Fred Derry in The Best Years of Our Lives (1946).

Early life 
Andrews was born on a farmstead near Collins in southern Mississippi, the third of 13 children of Charles Forrest Andrews, a Baptist minister, and his wife Annis (née Speed). The family subsequently relocated to Huntsville, Texas, the birthplace of his younger siblings, including fellow Hollywood actor Steve Forrest (born William Forrest Andrews).

Andrews attended college at Sam Houston State University in Huntsville and studied business administration in Houston. During 1931, he traveled to Los Angeles to pursue opportunities as a singer. He worked various jobs, such as at a gas station in the nearby community of Van Nuys. To help the struggling Andrews study music at night, "The station owners stepped in ... with a deal: $50 a week for full-time study, in exchange for a five-year share of possible later earnings", which he started repaying after signing with Goldwyn.

Career

Sam Goldwyn and 20th Century Fox 

In 1938, Andrews was spotted in the play Oh Evening Star and Samuel Goldwyn signed the promising actor to a contract, but felt he needed time to develop experience. Andrews continued at the Pasadena Playhouse, working in over 20 productions and proposed to second wife Mary Todd. After twelve months, Goldwyn sold part of Andrews' contract to 20th Century Fox, where he was put to work on the first of two B pictures; his first role was in Lucky Cisco Kid (1940). He then appeared in Sailor's Lady (1940), developed by Goldwyn, but released by Fox.

Andrews was loaned to Edward Small to appear in Kit Carson (1940), before Goldwyn used him for the first time in a Goldwyn production: William Wyler's The Westerner (1940), featuring Gary Cooper.

Andrews had supporting roles in Fox films Tobacco Road (1941), directed by John Ford; Belle Starr (1941), with Randolph Scott and Gene Tierney, billed third; and Swamp Water (1941), starring Walter Brennan and Walter Huston and directed by Jean Renoir.

His next film for Goldwyn was the Howard Hawks comedy Ball of Fire (1941), again teaming with Cooper, with Andrews playing the villain, a gangster.

Leading man 

Back at Fox, Andrews was given his first lead, in the B-picture war movie Berlin Correspondent (1942). He was second lead to Tyrone Power in Crash Dive (1943) and then appeared in the 1943 film adaptation of The Ox-Bow Incident with Henry Fonda, in a role often cited as one of his best in which he played a lynching victim.

Andrews then went back to Goldwyn for The North Star (1943), directed by Lewis Milestone. He worked on a government propaganda film December 7th: The Movie (1943), then was used by Goldwyn again in Up in Arms (1944), supporting Danny Kaye.

Andrews was reunited with Milestone at Fox for The Purple Heart (1944), then was in Wing and a Prayer (1944) for Henry Hathaway.

Critical success and noir 

One of his most famous roles was as a detective infatuated with a presumed murder victim, played by Gene Tierney, in Laura (1944), produced at Fox and directed by Otto Preminger. He co-starred with Jeanne Crain in the movie musical State Fair (1945), a huge hit, and was reunited with Preminger for the film noir Fallen Angel (1945). Andrews made another war movie with Milestone, A Walk in the Sun (1945), then was loaned to Walter Wanger for a western, Canyon Passage (1946), directed by Jacques Tourneur and co-featuring Susan Hayward.

Andrews' second film with William Wyler, also for Goldwyn, became his best known: The Best Years of Our Lives (1946). It was both a popular and critical success. Upon release, the topical film about American society's problems in re-integrating military veterans after World War II outgrossed the longstanding box office success of Gone with the Wind (1939) in the U.S. and Britain. In 2007, the film ranked number 37th on AFI's Top 100 Years...100 Movies.

Andrews appeared in Boomerang! (1947), directed by Elia Kazan; Night Song (1947), at RKO; and Daisy Kenyon (1947) for Preminger. In 1947, he was voted the 23rd most popular actor in the U.S.

Andrews starred in the anti-communist The Iron Curtain (1948), reuniting him with Gene Tierney, then Deep Waters (1948). He made a comedy for Lewis Milestone at Enterprise Pictures, No Minor Vices (1948), then traveled to England for Britannia Mews (1949). Andrews was in Sword in the Desert (1949), then Goldwyn cast him in My Foolish Heart (1949) with Susan Hayward. He played a fast-fisted police officer in the film noir Where the Sidewalk Ends (1950), also with Tierney and Preminger. Around this time, alcoholism began to damage Andrews's career, and on two occasions it nearly cost him his life behind the wheel.

Edge of Doom (1950), another film noir for Goldwyn, was a flop. Andrews was then loaned to RKO to make Sealed Cargo (1951), in which his brother Steve Forrest has an uncredited role. (In a "Word of Mouth" commentary for Turner Classic Movies, Forrest stated, "I'd have given my eye teeth to have worked with him.") Back at Fox, Andrews was in The Frogmen (1951), then Goldwyn cast him in I Want You (1951), an overwrought attempt to repeat the success of The Best Years of Our Lives, during the Cold War era Korean War.

From 1952 to 1954, Andrews was featured in the radio series I Was a Communist for the FBI, about the experiences of Matt Cvetic, an FBI informant who infiltrated the Communist Party of the United States of America.

Career decline 
Andrews' film career waned in the 1950s. Assignment: Paris (1952) was not widely seen. He made Elephant Walk (1954) in Ceylon, a film better known for Vivien Leigh's nervous breakdown and replacement by Elizabeth Taylor. Duel in the Jungle (1954) was an adventure tale, Three Hours to Kill (1954) and Smoke Signal (1955) were Westerns, Strange Lady in Town (1955) was a Greer Garson vehicle, and Comanche (1956) another Western.

By the mid-1950s, Andrews was acting almost exclusively in B-movies. However, his acting in two late-cycle film noirs for Fritz Lang during 1956, While The City Sleeps, Beyond a Reasonable Doubt, and a horror film, Curse of the Demon (1957), and a noir, The Fearmakers (1958), for Jacques Tourneur, are well regarded. Around this time, he also appeared in Spring Reunion (1957), Zero Hour! (1957), and Enchanted Island (1958).

In 1952, Andrews toured with his wife, Mary Todd, in The Glass Menagerie, and in 1958, he replaced Henry Fonda (his former co-star in The Oxbow Incident and Daisy Kenyon) on Broadway in Two for the Seesaw.

Television 
Andrews began appearing on television on such shows as Playhouse 90 ("Right Hand Man", "Alas, Babylon"), General Electric Theatre, The Barbara Stanwyck Show, Checkmate, The DuPont Show of the Week, The Twilight Zone ("No Time Like the Past"), The Dick Powell Theatre, Alcoa Premiere, Ben Casey, and Theatre of Stars.

Andrews continued to make films like The Crowded Sky (1960) and Madison Avenue (1961). He then went to Broadway for The Captains and the Kings, which had a short run in 1962.

In 1963, he was elected president of the Screen Actors Guild.

In 1965, Andrews resumed his film work with support roles in The Satan Bug and In Harm's Way. Although he had the lead in films such as Crack in the World (1965), Brainstorm (1965), and Town Tamer (1965), he was increasingly cast in supporting roles: Berlin, Appointment for the Spies (1965), The Loved One (1965), Battle of the Bulge (1965), and Johnny Reno (1966). He occasionally played leads in low-budget films like The Frozen Dead (1966), The Cobra (1967) and Hot Rods to Hell (1967), however, by the late 1960s he had evolved into a character actor, as in The Ten Million Dollar Grab (1967), No Diamonds for Ursula (1967), and The Devil's Brigade (1968).

By the end of the decade, Andrews returned to television to play the leading role of college president Tom Boswell on the NBC daytime soap opera Bright Promise from its premiere on September 29, 1969, until March 1971.

Later career 
Andrews spent the 1970s in supporting roles of Hollywood films such as The Failing of Raymond (1971), Innocent Bystanders (1972), Airport 1975 (1974), A Shadow in the Streets (1975), The First 36 Hours of Dr. Durant (1975), Take a Hard Ride (1975), The Last Tycoon (1976), The Last Hurrah (1977), and Good Guys Wear Black (1978)

He also appeared regularly on TV in such shows as Ironside, Get Christie Love!, Ellery Queen, The American Girls, The Hardy Boys, and The Love Boat.

It was at this time, the 1970s, that Andrews became involved in the real estate business, telling one newspaper reporter, for example, that he owned "a hotel that brings in $200,000 a year."

Andrews's final roles included Born Again (1978), Ike: The War Years (1979), The Pilot (1980), Falcon Crest (1982–83) and Prince Jack (1985).

Personal life 
Andrews married Janet Murray on December 31, 1932. Murray died in 1935 as a result of pneumonia. Their unnamed baby was also born and died on the same day, during her illness. 

Their son, David, was a musician and composer who died from a cerebral hemorrhage in 1964 at the age of 30. On November 17, 1939, Andrews married actress Mary Todd, with whom he had three children: Katharine, Stephen, and Susan. For two decades, the family lived in Toluca Lake, California.

Andrews struggled with alcoholism but eventually won the battle and worked actively with the National Council on Alcoholism and Drug Dependence. During 1972, he appeared in a television public service advertisement concerning the subject.

During the last years of his life, Andrews suffered from Alzheimer's disease. He spent his final years living at the John Douglas French Center for Alzheimer's Disease in Los Alamitos, California.

On December 17, 1992,  Andrews died of congestive heart failure and pneumonia. His wife died in 2003 at the age of 86.

Filmography 

Lucky Cisco Kid (1940, movie debut) as Sergeant Dunn
Sailor's Lady (1940) as Scrappy Wilson
Kit Carson (1940) as Captain John C. Fremont
The Westerner (1940) as Sergeant Dunn
Tobacco Road (1941) as Captain Tim
Belle Starr (1941) as Maj. Thomas Crail
Swamp Water (1941) as Ben
Ball of Fire (1941) as Joe Lilac
Berlin Correspondent (1942) as Bill Roberts
Crash Dive (1943) as Lt. Cmdr. Dewey Connors
The Ox-Bow Incident (1943) as Donald Martin
The North Star (1943) as Kolya Simonov
December 7th (1943) as Ghost of US Sailor Killed at Pearl Harbor
Up in Arms (1944) as Joe
The Purple Heart (1944) as Capt. Harvey Ross
Wing and a Prayer (1944) as Lt. Cmdr. Edward Moulton
Laura (1944) as Det. Lt. Mark McPherson
State Fair (1945) as Pat Gilbert
Fallen Angel (1945) as Eric Stanton
A Walk in the Sun (1945) as Sgt. Bill Tyne
Canyon Passage (1946) as Logan Stuart
The Best Years of Our Lives (1946) as Fred Derry
Boomerang (1947) as State's Atty. Henry L. Harvey
Night Song (1947) as Dan
Daisy Kenyon (1947) as Dan O'Mara
The Iron Curtain (1948) as Igor Gouzenko
Deep Waters (1948) as Hod Stillwell
No Minor Vices (1948) as Perry Ashwell
The Forbidden Street (1949) as Henry Lambert / Gilbert Lauderdale
Sword in the Desert (1949) as Mike Dillon
My Foolish Heart (1949) as Walt Dreiser
Where the Sidewalk Ends (1950) as Det. Mark Dixon
Edge of Doom (1950) as Father Thomas Roth
Sealed Cargo (1951) as Pat Bannon
The Frogmen (1951) as Jake Flannigan
I Want You (1951) as Martin Greer
Assignment – Paris! (1952) as Jimmy Race
Elephant Walk (1954) as Dick Carver
Duel in the Jungle (1954) as Scott Walters
Three Hours to Kill (1954) as Jim Guthrie
Smoke Signal (1955) as Brett Halliday
Strange Lady in Town (1955) as Dr. Rourke O'Brien
Screen Snapshots: Hollywood Goes a Fishin (1956 short) as himself
Comanche (1956) as Jim Read
While the City Sleeps (1956) as Edward Mobley
Beyond a Reasonable Doubt (1956) as Tom Garrett
Spring Reunion (1957) as Fred Davis
Night of the Demon (1957) as John Holden
Zero Hour! (1957) as Lt. Ted Stryker
The Fearmakers (1958) as Alan Eaton
Enchanted Island (1958) as Abner "Ab" Bedford
The Crowded Sky (1960) as Dick Barnett.
Madison Avenue (1961) as Clint Lorimer
The Satan Bug (1965) as Gen. Williams
In Harm's Way (1965) as Admiral Broderick
Crack in the World (1965) as Dr. Stephen Sorenson
Brainstorm (1965) as Cort Benson
Town Tamer (1965) as Tom Rosser
Berlin, Appointment for the Spies (1965) as Col. Lancaster
The Loved One (1965) as Gen. Buck Brinkman
Battle of the Bulge (1965) as Col. Pritchard
Johnny Reno (1966) as Johnny Reno
The Frozen Dead (1966) as Dr. Norberg
Hot Rods to Hell (1967) as Tom Phillips
Supercolpo da 7 miliardi (The Ten Million Dollar Grab) (1967) as George Kimmins
The Cobra (1967) as Capt. Kelly
 No Diamonds for Ursula (1967) as Il gioielliere
The Devil's Brigade (1968) as Brig. Gen. Walter Naylor
The Failing of Raymond (1971, TV Movie) as Allan McDonald
Innocent Bystanders (1972) as Blake
Airport 1975 (1974) as Scott Freeman
A Shadow in the Streets (1975, TV Movie) as Len Raeburn
The First 36 Hours of Dr. Durant (1975 TV movie) as Dr. Hutchins
Take a Hard Ride (1975) as Morgan
The Last Tycoon (1976) as Red Ridingwood
The Last Hurrah (1977 TV movie) as Roger Shanley
Good Guys Wear Black (1978) as Edgar Harolds
Born Again (1978) as Tom Phillips
A Tree, a Rock, a Cloud (1978 short)
The Pilot (1980) as Randolph Evers
Ike: The War Years (1980 TV movie) as General George C. Marshall
Prince Jack (1985) as The Cardinal (final film role)

Partial television credits

Radio credits

References

External links 

 Dana Andrews on I Was a Communist for the FBI radio program
 
 
 
 
 Hollywood Enigma: Dana Andrews at  Carl Rollyson Biographies and Bulletins 
 Photographs and literature 

1909 births
1992 deaths
Male actors from Mississippi
Male actors from Texas
American male film actors
American male television actors
Presidents of the Screen Actors Guild
People from Covington County, Mississippi
People from Los Alamitos, California
20th-century American male actors
Sam Houston State University alumni
20th Century Studios contract players
Deaths from pneumonia in California
People from Huntsville, Texas